Danny Schreurs (born 28 August 1987) is a Dutch footballer who plays as a forward for RKSV Heer.

He has by commentators been dubbed as "Messi Schreurs", because of his pace, good ball control and ability to score goals.

Club career
Schreurs started his career in the youth of MVV from his hometown Maastricht, but did not manage to break through to the first team. Afterwards, he was signed by Fortuna Sittard, where he made his professional debut in 2006. There he played together with Ruud Boymans on the two striker positions.

In June 2009, Schreurs signed a two-year contract with FC Zwolle. His first season in Zwolle was successful, scoring 9 goals in 29 league matches.

In June 2011, Schreurs signed a two-year contract with Willem II., 18 June 2011, voetbalprimeur.nl. After only half a year, Schreurs was sent on loan to his former team Fortuna Sittard, where he scored 9 times in 13 matches.

In July 2012, his contract was terminated by Willem II and Schreurs signed with MVV Maastricht. He was released in June 2014.

In August 2014, Schreurs made the remarkable move to MVV's biggest rival Roda JC Kerkrade.

Schreurs signed with Icelandic club Leiknir Reykjavík in July 2015. For the 2016–17 season, Schreurs played for the Sporting Hasselt, playing in the Belgian Third Division, who signed him from Bocholter VV. In 2017, he returned to the Netherlands to play for lower-tier amateur club RKSV Heer.

References

External links
 Voetbal International profile 
 

1987 births
Living people
Dutch footballers
Fortuna Sittard players
PEC Zwolle players
Willem II (football club) players
MVV Maastricht players
Roda JC Kerkrade players
Eerste Divisie players
Footballers from Maastricht
Association football forwards
Leiknir Reykjavík players
Úrvalsdeild karla (football) players
Expatriate footballers in Iceland
Expatriate footballers in Belgium
Dutch expatriate sportspeople in Iceland
Dutch expatriate sportspeople in Belgium
Dutch expatriate footballers